Every Soul a Star is a 2008 novel for children and young adults by Wendy Mass. Taking turns in first person from each of the main character's' point of view, it follows the stories of Jack, a confidence-lacking 14-year-old who is slightly overweight, Ally, an almost-13-year-old homeschooled girl who wants to be an astronomer, and Bree, a 13 year old whose life goal is to be on the cover of Seventeen before she is seventeen. They all meet and see a solar eclipse together while learning about what is truly important in life and becoming better people.

Plot 
Almost 13-year-old Ally lives at a  campsite called The Moon Shadow where she is homeschooled by her parents along with her 10-year-old brother Kenny. Although they don't have phone reception and have barely seen any TV lives, Ally’s dream is to find one of the Messier Objects. She then discovers that her family is moving to Chicago and she will be put in public school.

Meanwhile, 13-year-old Bree is the "A-Clique" in her school and is proud of it. Everyone calls her beautiful and she makes sure she stays that way. She wants to become a Prom Queen in high school and eventually be on the cover of Seventeen magazine before she's seventeen. Her "nerdy" family, however, has other plans. She and her 11-year-old sister, Melanie, are going to move to The Moon Shadow and take the place of Ally and her family as the caretakers of the campsite. Bree is appalled at the thought of moving and doesn't want to be homeschooled in the middle of nowhere, with no boys, no friends and most of all no television. 

Narrator 13-year-old Jack only finds comfort in reading and drawing in his tree house. His mom has been married four times. Jack has no friends, and he is shy and so overweight he is constantly teased. One of his other escapes is lucid dreaming, taught to him by his third stepfather, which also is how he can "fly" in his dreams. After failing science, he is faced with the choice of either attending summer school or going to The Moon Shadow as a part of a group tour to watch an eclipse with his teacher, Mr. Silver. He chooses to go to The Moon Shadow and meets several people during the trip to the campsite.

Eventually, all three children meet each other at The Moon Shadow and form an unlikely friendship. Bree and Ally plot to convince their parents to change their minds about the move, but they fail in their attempt. Jack is smitten with Ally, even though they may not see each other again (although, there is a good chance they will) and Bree is able to walk the labyrinth at the campsite, which she has been avoiding since she arrived. The group witnesses the eclipse, which amazes all of them, and leave all of them to accept their separate fates.  Bree's family invites Ally's family to visit for their annual "Star Party" each summer, while Bree personally teaches Ally the "ways of the world".  At the end, Ally notices Jack's stuffed bunny.  He hesitates at first, then explains that it is the only connection he has to his father, showing how he got over his lack-of-confidence issue while at The Moon Shadow. Friendship, change, and acceptance are shown strongly in this novel.

Author and Publication 

Every Soul a Star was written by Wendy Mass and published in 2008.

Length 

The novel is 336 pages long in paperback.

Awards 

The novel has won the 2012 Middle School/Junior High California Young Reader Medal and the Homeschool Book Award. The novel has also been nominated for:

 Rebecca Caudill Young Readers' Book Award, Illinois, 2012
 South Carolina Children's Book Award, 2011
 Oklahoma Sequoyah Book Award, 2010–2011
 Iowa Children's Choice Award, 2010–2011
 Maud Hart Lovelace Award, Minnesota, 2010–2011
 Black-Eyed Susan Book Award, Maryland, 2011
 Colorado Blue Spruce Young Adult Book Award, 2011
 William Allen White Award Children's Book Award, Kansas, 2011
 Kentucky Bluegrass Award, 2010
 New Hampshire Great Stone Face Book Award 2009-10
 Chosen as a CCBC (Cooperative Children's Book Center) Choice Selection

References

External links
Author's Website

2008 American novels
2008 children's books
American children's novels
American young adult novels
Novels by Wendy Mass